Neftalí Salvador Escobedo Zoletto (born 3 January 1957) is a Mexican politician from the National Action Party. From 2000 to 2003 he served as Deputy of the LVIII Legislature of the Mexican Congress representing Puebla.

References

1957 births
Living people
People from San Luis Potosí City
National Action Party (Mexico) politicians
21st-century Mexican politicians
Politicians from San Luis Potosí
Deputies of the LVIII Legislature of Mexico
Members of the Chamber of Deputies (Mexico) for Puebla